Enyalius bibronii is a species of lizard in the family Leiosauridae. It is native to Brazil.

References

Enyalius
Reptiles described in 1885
Reptiles of Brazil
Taxa named by George Albert Boulenger